The South Australian Country Football Championships is an annual Australian rules football competition run by the South Australian National Football League, played between representative teams from the six country football zones.

Current Zones 
The competing zones, which differ from the zones defined in the constitution of the South Australian Community Football League, consist of the following:

Competition Results

Don McSweeny Medal 
The Don McSweeny Medal is presented to the best player of the carnival, judged by the allocation of votes by the umpires of each game using the 3-2-1 method.  The medal is named after South Australian Football Hall of Famer Don McSweeny OAM.

Bill Murdoch Medal 
A Medal is presented to the Coach of the Championships.  Since 2013, the medal has been named the Bill Murdoch Medal

References 

Australian rules football competitions in South Australia